WRGP ("The Roar") is the student-run radio station of Florida International University in Miami, Florida, United States. WRGP broadcasts on 88.1 MHz from a transmitter site in rural Miami-Dade County at 17107 SW 248 Street and from rebroadcasters on the two largest FIU campuses: W237CP (95.3 MHz) at the main Modesto A. Maidique Campus (formerly the University Park campus), where the station's studios are located in the Graham Center, and W245BF (96.9 MHz) on the Biscayne Bay Campus in North Miami.

History 
The first student radio station at FIU was established in 1988 as a carrier current station on 540 KHz at the University Park campus, known as WUFI and primarily airing alternative rock. It emerged as a student government project.

In 1993, FIU applied to build an FM station on 88.1 MHz to transmit from Homestead. A construction permit was approved in 1995, and the station began airing in 1999 as WRGP "Radiate 88", having been delayed by paperwork with WTVJ (channel 6), which owned the tower from which the station broadcast; at launch, the station aired a more conventional contemporary hit radio format.

In 2004, the primary branding was changed by management to "Radio Golden Panther" (the original intended name, as it was the reason WRGP was selected as the call sign); in 2005, it reverted to Radiate FM. In early 2015, it was changed to "WRGP, FIU Student Radio" in an attempt to increase student awareness of the station. In 2017, the station adopted its current branding as "The Roar".

Due to power limitations associated with the Homestead transmitter, WRGP was unable to provide effective coverage of the University Park campus or Miami area on 88.1 MHz. This was remedied in 2006 with the installation of an FM translator at University Park, rebroadcasting the station on 95.3 MHz. In February 2008, the reach of the station was further expanded when another translator on 96.9 MHz was installed at FIU's Biscayne Bay Campus of FIU in North Miami, providing improved coverage of the major FIU campuses and the metropolitan area.

Programming 

WRGP's programming focuses on independent artists from across all genres of music. Dedicated exclusively to this format and style, commercial and mainstream music receive no airplay on WRGP.

The music for non-specialty day-parts is furnished by the Entertainment Director at the behest of his or herself. As many as 300 unique artists and four times as many tracks make up the regular rotation of music played during non-specialty programming hours. This rotation of music is updated weekly and will often include older albums selected by the staff from the station archives for regular airplay. The format is designed to be flexible enough to allow DJs to pick their own music and to fill listener requests whenever possible. Unlike other stations, where rotation libraries are exclusively digitized, WRGP still relies on CDs and CD decks in the studio.

Specialty programming 

Each night of the week is dedicated to a particular genre of music, although constantly changing, is produced entirely by specialty DJs who operate independently. These DJs furnish their own music for these programs and are not bound by the formatics of other day-parts.

Community service 

As a non-commercial educational radio station, WRGP airs public service announcements in lieu of commercial advertising and carries locally produced news updates provided by its in-house news department. In the event of a Hurricane Warning, the station switches over to NOAA Weather Radio station KHB34 during the duration of the storm until it has passed over.

Sports 

WRGP also carries extensive live coverage of FIU Golden Panthers athletics with its own staff of announcers and analysts. The station has covered both several Sun Belt tournaments across varying sports as well as both of FIU's Bowl game appearances. As of 2012, WRGP is the only station on terrestrial radio that carries FIU football, basketball and baseball.

Structure 

The content aired on WRGP is done so entirely at the discretion of the station staff. While licensed to the FIU Board of Trustees, funded by the Student Government Association and overseen by a media adviser, the radio station operates as an autonomous entity within the university. The station staff is made up entirely of FIU students. At any time, WRGP may have as many as 80 live DJs filling the day-parts in shifts that range from 1 to 3 hours of airtime.

A General Manager is voted upon yearly by the FIU Media Board, which is a committee made up of university staff and local media professionals. The GM is ultimately responsible for all station operations including staffing and budgetary matters. The GM appoints and oversees an immediate staff of directors who administer the music, programming, training, promotions, news, sports and engineering departments.

Translators
In addition to the main station, 88.1, WRGP is relayed by additional translators to widen its broadcast area.

References

External links

Florida International University
RGP
Radio stations established in 1988
Homestead, Florida
1988 establishments in Florida